Stoutsville is a village in Monroe County, Missouri, United States. The population was 37 at the 2020 census.

History
Stoutsville was platted in 1871, and named after the family of Robert P. Stout, the original owners of the town site. A post office called Stoutsville has been in operation since 1872.

Geography
Stoutsville is located adjacent to the Buck Creek confluence with Mark Twain Lake and just south of U.S. Route 24. Paris is about ten miles to the southwest and Monroe City is about eleven miles to the northeast.

Demographics

2010 census
As of the census of 2010, there were 36 people, 16 households, and 14 families living in the village. The racial makeup of the village was 94.4% White and 5.6% from two or more races. Hispanic or Latino of any race were 2.8% of the population.

There were 16 households, of which 31.3% had children under the age of 18 living with them, 81.3% were married couples living together, 6.3% had a female householder with no husband present, and 12.5% were non-families. 12.5% of all households were made up of individuals. The average household size was 2.25 and the average family size was 2.43.

The median age in the village was 48.5 years. 16.7% of residents were under the age of 18; 5.7% were between the ages of 18 and 24; 16.7% were from 25 to 44; 41.6% were from 45 to 64; and 19.4% were 65 years of age or older. The gender makeup of the village was 50.0% male and 50.0% female.

2000 census
As of the census of 2000, there were 44 people, 24 households, and 15 families living in the village. The population density was 55.1 people per square mile (21.2/km). There were 41 housing units at an average density of 51.4 per square mile (19.8/km). The racial makeup of the village was 95.45% White and 4.55% Native American.

There were 24 households, out of which 4.2% had children under the age of 18 living with them, 62.5% were married couples living together, and 37.5% were non-families. 33.3% of all households were made up of individuals, and 8.3% had someone living alone who was 65 years of age or older. The average household size was 1.83 and the average family size was 2.20.

In the village, the population was spread out, with 6.8% under the age of 18, 2.3% from 18 to 24, 25.0% from 25 to 44, 31.8% from 45 to 64, and 34.1% who were 65 years of age or older. The median age was 52 years. For every 100 females, there were 100.0 males. For every 100 females age 18 and over, there were 115.8 males.

The median income for a household in the village was $31,875, and the median income for a family was $46,250. Males had a median income of $30,000 versus $13,750 for females. The per capita income for the village was $18,165. There were no families and 4.9% of the population living below the poverty line, including no under eighteens and none of those over 64.

References

External links
 Historic maps of Stoutsville in the Sanborn Maps of Missouri Collection at the University of Missouri

Villages in Monroe County, Missouri
Villages in Missouri
1871 establishments in Missouri